Le Chemin ("The Way") is a 2003 album recorded by French pop-rock act Kyo. It was released on January 13, 2003, and achieved huge success in France and Belgium (Wallonia), where it was respectively #2 and #1. This album, entirely composed by the band, remains to date its most successful one. There is also an edition including a DVD.

It stayed on the charts for 65 weeks in Belgium, 98 weeks in France and 79 weeks in Switzerland. It provided four top 20 singles in France and Belgium : "Le Chemin" (#12 in France, #4 in Belgium, #14 in Switzerland), "Dernière danse" (#6 in France, #4 in Belgium, #14 in Switzerland), "Je cours" (#20 in France, #8 in Belgium, #41 in Switzerland) and "Je saigne encore" (#13 in France, #12 in Belgium, #39 in Switzerland).

The album was awarded 'Francophone album of the year' at the 2004 NRJ Music Awards.

Track listing 
 "Le Chemin" (duet with Sita) — 3:31
 "Je cours" — 3:01
 "Dernière danse" — 3:48
 "Tout envoyer en l'air" — 3:12
 "Chaque seconde" — 3:50
 "Comment te dire" — 4:44
 "Je saigne encore" — 4:02
 "Je te vends mon âme" — 3:31
 "Pardonné" — 3:36
 "Sur nos lèvres" — 4:05
 "Tout reste à faire" — 4:56

Source : Allmusic.

Personnel and credits 
 Vocals by Benoit Poher and Fabien Dubos
 Guitar : Nicolas Chassagne and Florian Dubos
 Drums by Fabien Dubos
 Bass : Laurent Vernerey
 Choir arrangement : Jean Francois Berger
 Assistant : Elise Chambeyron
 Programming by Matthew Vaughan and Nicolas Chassagne
 Sampling by Nicolas Chassagne
 Mastering : Ian Cooper
 Mixing by Francois Delabriere
 Engineered by Hubert Decottignies and Francois Delabriere
 Photography : Marco De La Rosa
 Produced by François Delabrière

Releases

Certifications and sales

Charts

References 

2003 albums
Kyo (band) albums